Kao Chia-yu (born 17 October 1980) is a Taiwanese politician and a member of the Democratic Progressive Party (DPP). She was elected to the National Assembly in 2005. Upon assuming office, she became the youngest person to ever be seated in that legislative body. Between 2010 and 2020, Kao was a Taipei City Councillor. She was elected to the Legislative Yuan in 2020.

Early life and education 
Born in Keelung on 17 October 1980, Kao is the eldest in the family, with a sister and a brother. Her parents own a provision store.

She studied in the prestigious Taipei First Girls' High School, and proceeded to study law in the National Taiwan University (NTU). She now holds a Master's degree in Cross-Strait relations research from the NTU Graduate Institute of National Development. During her study in NTU, she became the 14th President of the NTU Student Association.

Political career 
Kao became an assistant of Legislative Yuan member Luo Wen-jia. She later won the 2005 National Assembly election and became the youngest member of the National Assembly in Republic of China history.

In the 2010 local elections, Kao was elected councillor of Taipei City, and was re-elected twice in 2014 and 2018.

She was initially nominated by the DPP to run for the 2008 legislative election, representing Taipei City District 6, but was replaced by Luo Wen-jia, after President Chen Shui-bian returned to lead the Democratic Progressive Party as chairman. In 2015, she protested DPP's decision not to nominate any candidate for the Neihu and Nangang district for the 2016 election.

She would occasionally sing in the public, but some netizens found her singing voice being terrible.

Personal life 
Kao dated her boyfriend, Ma Wen-yu, for more than a decade. Ma was her assistant and was her junior when they were both studying in NTU. In November 2021, Kao reported that her partner, physically assaulted her during an argument. Lin was formally arrested in December 2021, and indicted on eight criminal charges in January 2022. Charges against Lin included violations of privacy and personal freedom, bodily harm, coercion, intimidation, and slander targeting Kao, dissemination of malicious texts while using her computer, as well as the falsification of his own financial documents. In September 2022, the New Taipei District Court sentenced Lin to two years and ten months in prison.

See also

Lin Ying-meng

References

External links 
Profile of Taipei City Councillor Kao Chia-yu

1980 births
Living people
Politicians of the Republic of China on Taiwan from Keelung
Democratic Progressive Party Members of the Legislative Yuan
National Taiwan University alumni
21st-century Taiwanese women politicians
Members of the 10th Legislative Yuan
Taipei City Councilors
Taipei Members of the Legislative Yuan